Edavazhiyile Poocha Minda Poocha is a 1979 Indian Malayalam-language drama film directed by Hariharan, written by M. T. Vasudevan Nair and produced by K. C. Joy. The film stars Srividya, Madhu, Soman, and Ambika. The film has musical score by M. B. Sreenivasan.

Plot
Raja's daughter's marriage ceremony is soon approaching and preparations are underway at home. One day, Raja receives a call from his wife Rohini, who is the mother of the girl. Rohini and Raja have been separated for years and Rohini now expresses her desire to visit their daughter for the occasion. Raja is disturbed by the idea of Rohini's visit and tries to dissuade her. However, Rohini is determined to come and starts her train journey.

As she travels, Rohini thinks about her past - her college days when she was more interested in studies, poetry, and books than in secret romances and flirting like her friends. After finishing her studies, she returns home and her parents arrange her marriage with Raja, a British-educated young upper-class Hindu man who is a top civil servant. The marriage takes place and Rohini is happy at first. However, her happiness does not last long as Raja's busy schedule keeps him away from her often and he even denies her advances for sex. Eventually, a child is born. After the birth of their child, Rohini adjusts to her new life as a socialite and spends her time balancing work as a college professor and taking care of her daughter.

One day, Raja's friend Bhagyanath comes to town and becomes a regular visitor to Raja's house. Gradually, an extramarital relationship emerges between Rohini and Bhagyanath. Initially, they are able to keep it a secret but soon rumours start to spread. Raja eventually discovers the affair and confronts Rohini. He decides to separate from her and wants them to never cross paths again. He takes custody of their child and enrolls her in a boarding school.

Rohini is shattered and seeks solace with Bhagyanath, but he does not accept her and begins to harass her. She receives no support from society and is even harassed by students at her college. 

Returning to the present day, Rohini arrives at a hotel and calls Raja to inform him that she wants to visit their daughter. Raja visits her at the hotel and tells her that he will not allow her to see their daughter, leaving Rohini feeling hopeless and ultimately leading her to commit suicide.

Cast

Srividya as Rohini
Madhu as Raja
Soman as Bhagyanath
Ambika as Syamala
William D'Cruz as Rohini's father
P. K. Venukkuttan Nair as Raja's friend
Adoor Pankajam as Kunjukuttyamma
Kottayam Santha as Raja's aunt
Vanchiyoor Radha as College principal
Rajamma Hari as Raja's friend
Kalaranjini as College lecturer
Sankaradi as Sankaran

Soundtrack
The music was composed by M. B. Sreenivasan and the lyrics were written by Yusufali Kechery.

Awards
 Kerala Film Critics Association Awards (1979)
 Kerala Film Critics Association Award for Best Actor – Madhu
 Kerala Film Critics Association Award for Best Actress – Srividya

References

External links
 

1979 films
1970s Malayalam-language films
Films directed by Hariharan
Films scored by M. B. Sreenivasan